The Islamic Society of Western Maryland (ISWMD), located in Hagerstown, Maryland, is a mosque which was the first permanent structure to be built specifically to serve as a mosque in Western Maryland. The mosque was built in 1994, after the American Revolutionary War-era home proved to be insufficient to accommodate the growing community.

The society ran a day-care for five years but canceled it in 2003 due to concerns after a threat made to the day-care.

See also
Islam in Maryland

References

External links

Mosques in Maryland
Buildings and structures in Hagerstown, Maryland
1994 establishments in Maryland
Mosques completed in 1994